Diving was contested at the 2019 Summer Universiade from 2 to 8 July 2019 at the Mostra d'Oltremare diving pool in Napoli.

Medal summary

Men's events

Women's events

Mixed

Medal table

References

External links
2019 Summer Universiade – Diving
Results Book – Diving (Archived version)

 
Universiade
2019 Summer Universiade events
Diving at the Summer Universiade
Diving competitions in Italy